Khalida Ismail is Professor of Psychiatry and Medicine at the Institute of Psychiatry, King's College London, specializing in diabetes and mental health. Ismail is an Honorary Consultant Liaison Psychiatrist at King's College Hospital NHS Foundation Trust.

Ismail researches into the epidemiology of the link between diabetes and depression and related disorders, along with evaluations of intervention methods. Her research has led to creation of 3 Dimensions of Care for Diabetes service (3DFD).

Selected publications

References

Academics of King's College London
British women academics
Living people
British psychiatrists
Year of birth missing (living people)